is a passenger railway station located in the city of Ono, Hyōgo Prefecture, Japan, operated by West Japan Railway Company (JR West).

Lines
Ichiba Station is served by the Kakogawa Line and is 11.5 kilometers from the terminus of the line at

Station layout
The station consists of two ground-level opposed side platforms connected by a footbridge. The station is unattended.

Platforms

History
Ichiba Station opened on 10 August 1913. With the privatization of JNR on 1 April 1987, the station came under the control of JR West.

Passenger statistics
In fiscal 2019, the station was used by an average of 196 passengers daily

Surrounding area
 Hakuundani Onsen Yupika

See also
List of railway stations in Japan

References

External links

  

Railway stations in Hyōgo Prefecture
Stations of West Japan Railway Company
Railway stations in Japan opened in 1913
Ono, Hyōgo